Flydubai, legally Dubai Aviation Corporation, is an Emirati government-owned low-cost airline in Dubai, United Arab Emirates with its head office and flight operations in Terminal 2 of Dubai International Airport. The airline operates a total of 114 destinations, serving the Middle East, Africa, Asia and Europe from Dubai.  The company slogan is Get Going.

History

In July 2008, the government of Dubai established the airline. Although Flydubai is not part of The Emirates Group, Emirates supported Flydubai during the initial establishing phase.

On 14 July 2008 Flydubai signed a firm order with American aircraft manufacturer Boeing at the Farnborough Air Show for 50 Boeing 737-800s with a total value of US$3.74 billion, with the option to change the order to the larger and longer range Boeing 737-900ER, according to the airline's demand. The first of these aircraft was delivered on 17 May 2009. Scheduled flights commenced on 1 June, with services to Beirut, Lebanon, and Amman, Jordan. Since then, the route network has been significantly expanded.

On 13 February 2013, Flydubai announced that it was in talks with Boeing and Airbus for a 50-aircraft order. On 19 June 2013, the airline announced that it would be adding business class service to its flights. The business class cabin would feature 12 seats between aisle and window, three-course meals, 12-inch televisions, a business class lounge, Italian leather seats to its offering in a bid to cater to business travellers in the emirate, access to more than 200 films, and power outlets suitable for plugs from over 170 countries.

In March 2020, Flydubai suffered considerable losses due to the grounding of Boeing's Max 737 aircraft around the world. The state-owned company claims that its growth strategy was severely impacted by the incident as it had 11 of the said aircraft, as well as more than 220 on order. Company CEO Ghaith Al-Ghaith said that an interim settlement agreement was made with Boeing for certain compensation but details of the agreement remain confidential.

On November 4, 2020, FlyDubai announced that it would start direct flights between Tel Aviv and Dubai from November 26, with tickets being offered on sale. This would mark the first commercial flight route between Dubai and Tel Aviv.

Corporate affairs

Management and ownership
The company was formed on 19 March 2008 as a venture by the Government of Dubai. The Government of Dubai also owns Emirates Airlines; however, the common ownership is the only connection between the two airlines. Even though the airline did get some help from its sister airline initially, it has been run independently since. Also, there was an initial move of executives, but the major bulk of the hiring comes from outside the Emirates group. The CEO of the company is Ghaith Al-Ghaith, who spent over 22 years with Emirates. The chair of the company is Ahmed bin Saeed Al Maktoum, who is also the chairman of the Emirates group.

Headquarters
flydubai operates entirely out of Dubai and currently has its Operations building near Terminal 2 at Dubai International Airport in addition to some flights departing from Terminal 3. Initially, flydubai had intentions to operate from the new Al-Maktoum International Airport in the Dubai World Centre in Jebel Ali.

Development Centres
Flydubai sets up its first ‘Indian Development Centre’ (IDC) in Hyderabad. The centre  leads flydubai's IT and technology innovation which will focus on Passenger service systems (PSS). IDC will be a hub for software development, research and operations.

Business trends
The key trends for flydubai over recent years are shown below (as at year ending 31 December):

Reports released on May 2, 2021 revealed that Flydubai witnessed losses of US$194 million in 2020. The airline faced one of the toughest years in the aviation sector as revenues plunged by more than 50% to reach US$773 million in 2020. 
In June 2020, the airline had reduced salaries of its employees and also put some on unpaid leaves for a year.

Destinations

As of May 2017, flydubai serves more than 90 destinations. The airline currently has one hub and operates out of Terminal 2 of Dubai International Airport. However, to accommodate for the growing airline and the expansion of the national airline at DXB, flydubai began to operate flights out of Al-Maktoum International (DWC) from 25 October 2015. The airline began with 70 flights per week to Amman, Beirut, Chittagong, Doha, Kathmandu, Kuwait and Muscat from DWC.

Codeshare agreements
flydubai codeshares with the following airlines:

 Emirates

Fleet

Current fleet
The Boeing customer code for Flydubai is KN, which appears in the designation of its older Boeing aircraft as an infix, such as 737-8KN. , the Flydubai fleet consists of the following Boeing 737 aircraft:

Order history
Boeing 737-800
At the Farnborough Air Show in July 2008, the airline ordered 50 Boeing 737-800s valued at approximately US$3.74 billion with substitution rights to convert its 737-800 orders to 737-900ERs (extended range) in the future. In November 2010, flydubai agreed a sale and leaseback deal with Avolon on another four 737-800s.

Boeing 737 MAX
On 17 November 2013 at the Dubai Airshow, Boeing and flydubai announced a commitment for about 100 Boeing 737 MAX 8s and 11 Boeing 737-800 Next Generation aircraft. This commitment was valued at about US$11.4 billion at list prices, making it the largest ever Boeing single-aisle airliner purchase in the Middle-East. On 6 January 2014, flydubai finalised its Boeing 737 MAX order. The order was finalised with an order for 75 Boeing 737 MAX 8s and 11 Boeing 737-800 Next Generation aircraft, along with the purchase rights for 25 more Boeing 737 MAX aircraft. This order is valued at US$8.8 billion at list prices. On 31 July 2017, flydubai took delivery of its first Boeing 737 MAX 8, making it the first airline in the Middle East to operate the type. At the November 2017 Dubai Air Show, Flydubai signed a landmark commitment for 175 Boeing 737 MAX aircraft and 50 purchase rights. This order for 225 aircraft is valued to be $27 billion at current list prices. More than 50 of the first 175 airplanes will be the new 737 MAX 10, while the rest will be the 737 MAX 9 and additional 737 MAX 8s. This historic commitment represents the largest single-aisle jet purchase by a Middle East airline. On 21 December 2017, flydubai finalized its purchase of 175 Boeing 737 MAX airplanes in the largest single-aisle jet order in Middle East history first announced at the 2017 Dubai Air Show.

In-flight features

Economy class
Full meal service is provided on some services to European and African destinations. Alcoholic beverages and additional snacks can be purchased after main service has finished. On other flights within the network, passengers can pre-book a hot meal, and on flights over 3 hours and on shorter flights, a full menu of wraps and sandwiches is available. Purchases can be made from the crew or from the personal touch screens in each seat.

Business class
In June 2012, it was announced that business class would be added as a service. , 85 of flydubai's destinations have the business class service. Each business class equipped aircraft contains 12 seats with a seat pitch of 42 inches. Along with a wider seat, on board the airline offers services such as: a choice of snacks, meals and drinks; access to more than 200 films, a power outlet, blankets and pillows and noise-cancelling headphones. The Business Class services also extend at selected airports. At selected airports they offer priority check-in and fast track through security checks. On 6 July 2014, flydubai announced the opening of their business lounge at Dubai International Airport. The lounge is located in Terminal 2 and has a free Wi-Fi, Refreshments and Snacks.

Safety video
The flydubai safety video features characters from the computer-animated Emirati television series Freej. The central character in the video is a flight attendant named Maya.

Ground handling
flydubai passengers can transfer their baggage to connecting Emirates and flydubai flights when checking-in.

Accidents and incidents
On 26 January 2015, a flydubai Boeing 737-800 operating Flight 215 from Dubai to Baghdad, was hit by small arms fire on approach to Baghdad International Airport with 154 passengers on board. The aircraft landed safely and no medical attention was needed at the airport.
On 19 March 2016, Flydubai Flight 981, a Boeing 737-800 operating from Dubai to Rostov-on-Don in Russia, crashed during a go-around in inclement weather at Rostov-on-Don Airport. All 55 passengers and 7 crew on board died in the accident. It was the first fatal accident in the airline's history. Investigation conducted by the Interstate Aviation Committee ruled that the 2016 accident was the result of pilot error.

References

External links 

 

Airlines established in 2008
Companies based in Dubai
Low-cost carriers
Government-owned airlines
Government-owned companies of the United Arab Emirates
Airlines of the United Arab Emirates
Emirati brands
Emirati companies established in 2008